Itumbiara Esporte Clube, usually known simply as Itumbiara, is a Brazilian football club from Itumbiara, Goiás state. The club competed in the Campeonato Brasileiro Série A in 1979 and won the state championship in 2008.

History
On March 9, 1970, Itumbiara Esporte Clube was founded, as a result of the merger of local teams Goiás (founded in 1964) and Nacional (founded in 1952).

In 1979, Itumbiara competed in the top level of the Brazilian Championship, finishing in the 64th position.

In 2008, Itumbiara won the state championship for the first time, after beating Goiás 1–0 and 3–0 in the final.

In 2010, Itumbiara finished state championship on 9th and penultimate place and were relegated to second level. Due to this performance they were qualified to 2011 Campeonato Brasileiro Série D because all 2011 Campeonato Goiano teams withdrew.

Achievements
 Campeonato Goiano:
 Winners (1): 2008

Stadium

Itumbiara's stadium is Estádio JK, inaugurated in 1977, with a maximum capacity of 20,000 people.

References

External links
 Itumbiara Esporte Clube at Arquivo de Clubes
Official site

 
Association football clubs established in 1970
Football clubs in Goiás
1970 establishments in Brazil